William H. Corlett (1856 – October 7, 1937), also known  as W. H. Corlett, was an American architect and contractor active in Napa County, California and the surrounding area. Several buildings and residences he designed are listed on the National Register of Historic Places.

Work
Works include (with attribution):
Alexandria Hotel and Annex, 840-844 Brown St. Napa, CA (Corlett, William H.), NRHP-listed
Downtown Oakland Historic District, roughly along Broadway from 17th to 11th St. Oakland, CA (Reed & Corlett), NRHP-listed 
Manasse Mansion (1886), 443 Brown St. Napa, CA (Corlett, W.H.), NRHP-listed
Migliavacca House, Division St. Napa, CA (Corlett, W.H.), NRHP-listed
Napa Abajo-Fuller Park Historic District, roughly bounded by the Napa River, Pine, Jefferson, 3rd, 4th, and Division Sts. Napa, CA (Corlett, William H.), NRHP-listed
Napa County Courthouse Plaza, bounded by Coombs, Second, Brown and Third Sts. Napa, CA (Corlett, William H.), NRHP-listed
Noyes Mansion, 1750 First St. Napa, CA (Corlett, William H.), NRHP-listed
St. Helena Carnegie Library, 1360 Oak Ave. St. Helena, CA (Corlett, William), NRHP-listed
US Post Office-Napa Franklin Station, 1352 2nd St. Napa, CA (Corlett, William H.; Reed & Corlett), NRHP-listed
Capt. N. H. Wulff House, 549 Brown St. Napa, CA (Corlett, William H.), NRHP-listed

Corlett died at his home in Napa, California, on October 7, 1937, aged 81.

References

Architects from California
1856 births
1937 deaths